Pteraspididae is an extinct family of heterostracan vertebrates. It is an Early Devonian-aged family that contains the stereotypical, torpedo-shaped pteraspidids, such as the type genus, Pteraspis, and its close relatives Errivaspis and Rhinopteraspis, that are popularly thought to have actively swam about in the water column. The elongated rostral plate is thought to help with their hydrodynamic ability. Various genera are found in various marine and estuarine strata of Early Devonian Europe and North America.

Genera 
 †Althaspis
 †Blieckaspis
 †Brachipteraspis
 †Errivaspis
 †Escharaspis
 †Grumantaspis
 †Helaspis
 †Larnovaspis
 †Loricopteraspis
 †Miltaspis
 †Mitraspis
 †Mylopteraspidella
 †Mylopteraspis
 †Podolaspis
 †Pteraspis
 †Rhinopteraspis
 †Stegobranchiaspis

References 

 On the recent discovery of Pteraspidian fish in the upper Silurian rocks of North America. Edward Waller Claypole, Quart. Journ. Geol. Soc. 1885, volume 41, pages 48–64, 
 Revised classification of Pteraspididae with description of new forms from Wyoming. Robert Howland Denison,  Fieldiana. Geology ; v. 20, no. 1,

External links 
 

 Pteraspididae at fossilworks.org (retrieved 17 April 2016)
 

Pteraspidiformes
Devonian jawless fish
Early Devonian fish
Prehistoric jawless fish families
Early Devonian first appearances
Early Devonian extinctions